Eliza Lucy Grey, Lady Grey (17 December 1822 – 4 September 1898), was the daughter of British Royal Navy officer Captain Sir Richard Spencer and Ann, Lady Spencer. She was the wife of Sir George Grey.

Early life
Elizabeth Lucy Spencer was born 17 December 1822 in a quaint and modest house near the Cobb in Lyme Regis, Dorset, England.

In 1833, her father was knighted and appointed Government Resident at Albany, Western Australia on the recommendation of Sir James Stirling. In the same year the Spencer family sailed in the storeship HMS Buffalo, loaded with plants, livestock, farm implements, stores and servants reaching Western Australia in September of that year. Her father purchased the Government Farm, and she resided there with her parents, seven brothers and two sisters. They lived in a pise cottage until, in 1836, the current two-storey stone house was built adjoining the older home.

Marriage

George Grey was a visiting magistrate in Albany when he met young Eliza Lucy, the seventh child of Sir Richard and Lady Spencer, at their Strawberry Hill Farm. George and Eliza married on 2 November 1839 at the farm after a brief courtship. She was sixteen and he was twenty-seven.

Their only child, a son named George, born 1841, lived only five months. It has been said that George blamed Eliza for his death, claiming their child was neglected.

They journeyed to England but would return to Australia when Grey was appointed the third Governor of South Australia, from 1841 to 1845. From there they moved onto New Zealand where George was Governor of New Zealand from 1845 to 1853. In 1848 Grey was created a Knight Commander of the Order of the Bath, making Eliza Lady Grey.

Grey, a keen naturalist, sent a skin of a honey possum, together with a description, to the Zoological Society of London, suggesting that it be named Tarsipes spenserae, after his wife. These findings were published by the Society on 8 March 1842. The scientific name was accepted for nearly 150 years and it wasn't until post-1970 that an earlier claim by Gervais & Verreaux (albeit by only 5 days) was recognised.

Grey amassed a sizeable collection of artefacts in Australia and New Zealand. These, along with copious research notes he had made about the indigenous cultures of both lands, were intended as the basis for his later published works. When not occupied with government work involving bureaucrats or military officials Grey was sequestered with local Maori, recording their myths and songs and learning their language. Eliza's attitude to Grey's literary and anthropological interests is unknown, but it seems a fair guess she was probably indifferent.

In 1848 Government House in Auckland suffered a massive fire and the Greys lost many of their possessions; furniture, linen, china & silver, brought out from England and very difficult to replace in such a small isolated colony. Also destroyed were Grey's considerable collection of artefacts and manuscripts.

This undoubtedly had a traumatic effect on Grey, who threw himself into his work. He spent the next few years travelling widely throughout New Zealand inspecting the new Colony and ascertaining the exact political situation at a time when tensions were increasing between the settlers and the Maori. He slowly replaced a lot of the destroyed New Zealand material in his collections.
 
Eliza was left by herself in Auckland in the replacement Government House for months on end, which may have contributed to the deterioration of their relationship. Left to her own devices, Eliza enjoyed herself as the most important female in Auckland society and her apparent happiness in his absence may well have annoyed Grey, who was known to have a fiery temper and possibly a jealous streak. Eliza's bubbly personality, which may have attracted George to her in Albany, might have concerned him now. The possibility of flirtatious behaviour being misconstrued as infidelity on her part may have created more stress for him.

In 1854 the Greys arrived in the Cape where Sir George Grey had been posted as Governor of the Cape Colony. Returning to the Cape following a visit to England in 1860, there was an incident and the marriage hit stormy waters. This took place at Rio de Janeiro (which seems an unusually indirect route from England to South Africa).  George accused Eliza of flirting with the ship's captain, Admiral Henry Keppel. The boat was quickly turned around and the disgraced Eliza was left ashore at Rio de Janeiro. George continued his voyage back to Cape Town alone.

Later life
George Grey and his wife Eliza had an unhappy marriage; it seems plain that they were simply ill suited to each other. Initially attracted by her beauty and bubbly personality, Grey was probably the sort of man who actually needed another sort of person as his life partner. It is likely he assumed that his pretty, vivacious bride would naturally transform into a demure, sensible mother who would take an intelligent interest in his intellectual pursuits. He (like the Duke of Wellington whose marriage failed for very similar reasons) was simply unprepared for the reality that his wife's personality and youth was not going to live up to his high expectations. That she was mere 16 to his 27 at the time of marriage and that he is said to have blamed her for the death of their only child cannot be overlooked as a probable source of misery for Eliza. As divorce was not an option at the time they may have ended up feeling trapped in a loveless (and in this case childless) marriage.

Infidelity may have been a particularly sore point for him; Grey's father died before he was born and there were rumours that Lieutenant-Colonel George Grey was not actually his parent. Grey's meteoric rise through the colonial service contributed to the rumours that his real father was in fact Prince Edward, Duke of Kent and Strathearn (making him Queen Victoria's half-sibling) or one of the other Royal Dukes, explaining the favouritism shown to him by Victoria. Untrue as this was, Grey was aware of the rumours and thus probably hypersensitive to any behaviour by Eliza that might be misconstrued as infidelity. Eliza was very possibly innocent of any real indiscretion, but it is now impossible to know the truth. He was noted for never mentioning her name for the period of their separation, a fact which rather speaks to his inflexible nature.

The Greys were estranged for 36 years; he in New Zealand, she in England – on opposite sides of the world. Grey continued his political career in New Zealand, and remarkably, transitioned from the role of Governor to that of Premier, continuing to play a pivotal role in the formation of the country. Eliza by contrast lived very quietly and largely resided away from London. This seems in contrast to her twenty years of married life where she enjoyed being at the centre of lively and fashionable social events. She converted to the Roman Catholic Church and it was said she became very religious in her later years, devoting much time and energy to charitable works.

In 1894 Grey returned to England and was made a Privy Councilor to the Queen. The Greys were reconciled, it has been said, only through the personal intervention of Queen Victoria and the Gladstones, only a year before they both died in 1898. George Grey died on 19 September in London, having been nursed by Eliza during his last illness which lasted for 18 months. Eliza, however, pre-deceased him by 14 days. She was 75 years old.

Following an attack of influenza Eliza suffered 

Separated in death as in life, Eliza's was buried at Bournemouth, Grey (too ill to accompany her to Bournemouth or to attend her funeral) received a state funeral and was interred in St Paul's Cathedral.

Her obituary in part read:

See also
Lady Grey, Eastern Cape, a village in South Africa named in honour of Eliza

Notes

References
 Barbarina Charlotte Lady Grey, My dear Maria: the Cape letters and journal of Barbarina Charlotte, Lady Grey, 1857–1860, Friends of the South African Library, 1997  
 Harry Bioletti, Whatever Happened to Lady Grey? Or, The Many Shades of Grey: Being a Look Into the Private Lives of Lady Eliza Lucy Grey and Her Husband Sir George Grey, H. Bioletti, 2001

External links
 Lady Eliza L. Grey, National Portrait Gallery 
 Lady Eliza Lucy Grey | NZETC

1822 births
1898 deaths
19th-century Australian people
19th-century English people
19th-century New Zealand people
Settlers of Western Australia
English emigrants to Australia
English emigrants to New Zealand
History of Western Australia
Spouses of Australian politicians
Spouses of prime ministers of New Zealand
Women of the Victorian era